The Fort Wayne Fury was a professional basketball team in the Continental Basketball Association (CBA) from 1991 through the cessation of the CBA on February 8, 2001.

History
The team played at the Allen County War Memorial Coliseum in Fort Wayne, Indiana. The Fury finished as the league's runner-up in the 1996 season. Former members of the team include former Indiana University standouts Damon Bailey, Jay Edwards, Michael Lewis and Greg Graham, NBA guard/forward Stephen Jackson, former multiple-time World Heavyweight Championship (professional wrestling) wrestler Kevin Nash, Mikki Moore, Lloyd Daniels and Percy Miller, better known as the rapper, "Master P". The original Fury coach was Gerald Oliver. NBA Hall of Famer Rick Barry also served as head coach of the team at one point. Another former coach was Keith Smart, who went on to coach the Cleveland Cavaliers of the NBA.  Smart then went on to spend one season as the head coach of the Golden State Warriors of the NBA and was the head coach of the Sacramento Kings until June 2013, when he was replaced by Mike Malone as the new head coach.

See also
History of sports in Fort Wayne, Indiana
Fort Wayne General Electrics
Fort Wayne Hoosiers

External links

Defunct basketball teams in the United States
Sports in Fort Wayne, Indiana
Continental Basketball Association teams
Basketball teams established in 1991
Basketball teams disestablished in 2001
1991 establishments in Indiana
2001 disestablishments in Indiana
Basketball teams in Indiana